Mount Razorback is a craggy mountain rising to about 1,600 m east of Staten Island Heights in the Convoy Ridge, Victoria Land. The descriptive name was applied by the 1957 New Zealand Northern Survey Party of the Commonwealth Trans-Antarctic Expedition, 1956–58.

Mountains of Victoria Land
Scott Coast